Ashley Lauren Melnick (born June 7, 1989) is an American beauty pageant titleholder who won the title of Miss Texas 2010. She competed in the Miss America 2011 Pageant on January 15, 2011, in Las Vegas, Nevada, placing in the Top 12. She competed at the pageant as Miss Fort Worth, and it was her third try for the title. She also won the Preliminary Talent and Preliminary Physical Fitness awards. Her platform is “The Voice of Autism” which she chose because her older brother is autistic. Her goal is to educate others both on autism and the needs of those who are autistic. She is a senior at Texas Christian University with a major in broadcast journalism and a minor in political science. Her career goals are to become both a news broadcaster and a recording artist.

References

External links

1989 births
American beauty pageant winners
Autism activists
Living people
Miss America 2011 delegates
People from Fort Worth, Texas
Texas Christian University alumni